Claudia Martha Haro is an American actress. She was previously married to Joe Pesci (1988–1992) and to Garrett Warren (1998–2000). Her screen roles were all in films with ex-husband Joe Pesci: as the newscaster in Jimmy Hollywood (1994), Marty in With Honors (1994), Trudy in Casino (1995), and Julie in Gone Fishin' (1997), with the exception of as the New Line Cinema receptionist in Wes Craven's New Nightmare (1994).

Haro has a daughter with ex-husband Garrett Warren.

On May 20, 2000, Haro's ex-husband Garrett Warren, from whom she had recently filed for divorce, was shot four times in the chest, neck, left hip, and right eye by a gunman who arrived at the front door of his Westlake Village, California, apartment. Warren survived the attack, but lost his right eye. In December 2005, Haro was arrested on charges related to the crime. She ultimately pleaded no contest to two counts of attempted murder and a principal firearm charge for the attempted murder of Warren and in April 2012 was sentenced to 12 years 4 months in prison. She served her sentence at the California Institution for Women in Chino, California. She was released in August 2019.

References

External links

Living people
Year of birth missing (living people)
20th-century American actresses
21st-century American actresses
Actresses from Pennsylvania
American film actresses
Criminals from California
American female criminals
21st-century American criminals